James Orr (24 July 1871 – 2 October 1942) was a Scottish footballer who played as a full back.

Career
Born in Dalry, Orr played club football for Kilmarnock, Darwen, Celtic, Kilmarnock Athletic and Galston, and made one appearance for Scotland in 1892.

References

1871 births
1942 deaths
Scottish footballers
Scotland international footballers
Footballers from North Ayrshire
Kilmarnock F.C. players
Darwen F.C. players
Celtic F.C. players
Galston F.C. players
Scottish Football League players
Association football fullbacks
People from Dalry, North Ayrshire